Goldsmith Prize may refer to:

 Goldsmith Book Prize, a US-based press, politics, and public policy book award
 Goldsmith Prize for Investigative Reporting, an award for journalists at Harvard University
 Goldsmiths Prize, a UK-based book award

See also
Goldman Environmental Prize
Goldsmith (disambiguation)